The following elections occurred in the year 1867.

North America

Canada
 1867 Canadian federal election
 1867 Nova Scotia general election
 1867 Ontario general election
 1867 Quebec general election

United States
 1867 New York state election
 United States Senate election in New York, 1867

Europe
 1867 Dalmatian parliamentary election

Africa
 1867 Liberian general election

See also
 :Category:1867 elections

1867
Elections